Victor Gustafson (c. 1905 – ?) was an American football player and coach. He served as the head football coach at Wheaton College in Wheaton, Illinois for six seasons, from 1929 to 1934, compiling a record of 14–27–5.

Head coaching record

References

Year of birth missing
Year of death missing
American football halfbacks
American football quarterbacks
Northwestern Wildcats football players
Wheaton Thunder football coaches